The 2021–22 Mid-American Conference men's basketball season began with practices in October 2021, followed by the start of the 2021–22 NCAA Division I men's basketball season in November. Conference began in January 2021 and concluded in March 2022. Toledo won their second straight MAC regular season title with a 17–3 conference record. 

Fourth seeded Akron defeated Kent State in the final of the MAC tournament. With the automatic bid, Akron was the only MAC schools to qualify for the NCAA tournament where they lost to UCLA in the first round. Toledo accepted a bid to the National Invitation Tournament where they lost to Dayton in the first round. Ohio accepted a bid to the College Basketball Invitational. Kent State accepted a bid to The Basketball Classic.

Preseason awards
The preseason coaches' poll and league awards were announced by the league office on November 3, 2021.

Preseason men's basketball coaches poll
(First place votes in parenthesis)
 Buffalo (11) 143
 Ohio 126
 Toledo (1) 107
 Kent State 98
 Akron (2) 95
 Bowling Green 93
 Miami 92
 Ball State 54
 Western Michigan 44
 Central Michigan 34
 Eastern Michigan 29
 Northern Illinois 21

MAC tournament champions: Buffalo (8), Bowling Green (1), Kent State (1), Miami (1), Toledo (1)

Honors

Conference matrix

All-MAC awards

Mid-American men's basketball weekly awards

Postseason

Mid–American tournament

NCAA tournament

Postseason awards

Coach of the Year: Rob Senderoff, Kent State
Player of the Year: Sincere Carry, Kent State
Freshman of the Year: Payton Sparks, Ball State
Defensive Player of the Year: Enrique Freeman, Akron
Sixth Man of the Year: Justyn Hamilton, Kent State

Honors

See also
2021–22 Mid-American Conference women's basketball season

References